The Norwegian gun-ships were a class of ten armed schooners that served first in the Royal Dano-Norwegian Navy, and then after 1814 in the Royal Norwegian Navy. The first was launched in 1808 and the last was lost in 1872.

Following the near total loss of the Danish-Norwegian fleet at the Battle of Copenhagen in September 1807, the Gunboat War and the British blockade of Danish ports was fought primarily in the relatively confined seas around Denmark. The Danes built their naval strategy on small gunboats that rarely ventured very far from their sheltered harbours.

As the British extended their blockade to the longer Norwegian coastline and up to Russia during the Anglo-Russian War (1807–1812), a different type of vessel became necessary. The result was the Norwegian gun-ship, a class of ten pine schooner-rigged vessels all  built to the same plan. Each was equipped with 30 oars to permit their crews to row them in calm weather; all were more or less identically armed.  These ships had a reputation for seaworthiness, a characteristic much needed in the waters of the Norwegian Sea that was their main area of operations.

The Dano-Norwegian navy stationed eight in Bergen and two in Trondheim, though this is a little deceptive. After the British Royal Navy captured two at the Battle of Silda, the Danes built two more to replace them. The two new schooners received the same names (Thor and Balder) as the lost schooners. Thus there was only a maximum of eight schooners on active duty at any one time.

Eight of the schooners were still in service in 1814, all of them based in the Norwegian ports of Bergen and Trondheim. Under the Treaty of Kiel, which provided for the separation of Norway from Denmark, those naval vessels in Norwegian ports automatically transferred to the new Norwegian navy. The schooners therefore continued their careers in the Norwegian navy, with the last serving until 1872.

The Ten Schooners

Notes, citations, and references
Notes

Citations

Individual record cards in Danish for ships of the Danish Royal Navy can sometimes be found  on the internet  link here. The Danish Naval Museum is building a new website at which details, drawings and models may be available. For individual ships already listed, see here but so far the Norske Kanonskønnerter are not named except for Hother. Design plans for Hother are the only ones that appear to be available on this site.

References
Christiansen, Henrik (2010):  Orlogsflådens skibe] gennem 500 år. (Danish Naval Ships over 500 years – in three volumes)
Fra Krigens Tid (1807 -1814) (From the wartime) edited by N A Larson, Christiana (Oslo) 1878. (- Marinen)
Royal Danish Naval Museum - Register of Danish Warships

Ships of the Royal Dano-Norwegian Navy
Ships of the Royal Norwegian Navy
1808 ships
1810 ships
1812 ships
Schooner classes
1814 in Norway